Yolande Henderson (14 January 1934 – 5 December 2015) was a Pakistani high school teacher.

Education
Yolande Henderson attended St Anne's School in Mumbai before relocating to Pakistan in 1950. After graduating from St Joseph's College in Karachi in 1954, she began her teaching profession.

She obtained a scholarship to Laval University in Canada to pursue her MA in literature, which she completed in 1957.

Career
While Father Stephen Raymond was the principal of St Patrick's High School in Karachi, she enrolled. Her teaching career at this institution lasted 34 years until she retired.

Raymond was described as "an educational visionary and leader" in a 2013 memorial to the late Bishop Anthony Theodore Lobo in the Christian Voice. She finished her teacher training while teaching at St. Patrick's.

Henderson took over as headmistress of the "O" Levels division at St Patrick's in 1991. The St Patrick's "O" Levels department was a remarkable institution under her leadership, with severe discipline, excellent academics, and fantastic extracurricular activities.

Henderson retired in 2006 due to deteriorating health. She is recognized as one of the professors who "focused more on life lessons and character development than on the curriculum."

One of her former pupils praised her as "one of the most well-loved teachers and mentors" during a school reunion on the 150th anniversary of its inception on October 18, 2010. Another student, Roland de Souza, called her "one of the best professors" he had ever had.

The Old Patricians (past students of the school) gave the Yolande Henderson Gold Medal to the highest student from the Cambridge "O" level section at the school's 150th anniversary closing ceremony on May 6, 2011.

The Society of Pakistan English Language Teachers (SPELT) paid homage to Henderson on October 12, 2012, saying that "her pupils all over the world are better people because of her leadership." 

The Express Tribune invited her to write a memorial to the late Bishop Anthony Theodore Lobo, a former administrator of St Patrick's High School, in March 2013.

Death
She died of intestinal cancer on December 5, 2015, at the age of 81, in Karachi. Her funeral was conducted the next day at Karachi's Saint Patrick's Cathedral. She was put to rest at Karachi's Gora Qabaristan.

Notable students
Rashid Minhas

Legacy
In her honor, an interscholastic basketball event named the Yolande Henderson Memorial Interscholastic Basketball Tournament was established in 2016. St Patrick's High School organized the competition, which was sponsored by the Karachi Basketball Association for both boys and girls.

References

Heads of schools in Pakistan
Pakistani Roman Catholics
Pakistani women
Pakistani people of Goan descent
Deaths from cancer in Pakistan
1934 births
2015 deaths
Pakistani schoolteachers